SpeXial is a Taiwanese boy band formed by Comic International Productions in 2012. The group name is a combination of "eXtra" and "Special", which expresses the desire of the group to be unique. The group started off with four members and debuted on December 7, 2012 with their self-titled album, SpeXial. After several lineup changes, the group's final line-up consists of only three members: Win, Ian, and Dylan. Their fandom name is SXF (Chinese: 特使), which represents "Special Mission".

On May 21–22, 2016, SpeXial held their first major concert "SpeXial the 1st concert - SpeXial Land 2016" at Xinzhuang Gymnasium in New Taipei City, with a guest appearance by Pets Tseng.

Career

2012 to 2013: Debut 
In 2012, Comic International Productions selected four boys whose average age was 20 years old and average height is 183 cm to form a new boy band named "SpeXial". The members included Wes (made his acting debut in Taiwanese Idol Drama K.O.3an Guo), Wayne (one of the top ten contestants of Taiwanese TV singing contest One Million Star (Season 6), Brent and Sam (made their acting debut in the television series KO One Return. Before releasing their first album, SpeXial received training in South Korea for a month.

On December 7, 2012, SpeXial debuted with their first self-titled Mandopop album, SpeXial. The album was funded by “2012 Funding the Production and Marketing of Outstanding Popular Music” of Bureau of Audiovisual and Music Industry Development. Also, SpeXial starred in Idol Drama KO One Return and performed the theme song and insert song.

In 2013, SpeXial starred in the sequel, KO One Re-act. They were invited by Executive Yuan for anti-drug campaign endorsement with Pets Tseng (who also starred in the sequel) because of their positive image in the drama.

2014: Break It Down 
On May 26, 2014, Comic International Productions announced the addition of three new members (increased to seven members), including Teddy (contestant of Shanghai Model Competition), Evan (Champion of 2012 Sunshine Nation – Sunshine Boyz) and Simon (scouted by the agency on the street). They officially debuted at the press conference of second Mandopop album Break it down on June 5, the album was released on June 12 and ranked No. 3 in Five Top Ranking (week 24 of year 2014) in the first week.

Also, Warner Music Taiwan spent 2 million TWD to create an online reality show Anything SpeXial, in order to introduce SpeXial in different aspects. The fourteen-episode show was released on May 27, 2014.

After starring in Idol Drama KO One Return and KO One Re-act and performing the theme songs, SpeXial took part in other dramas such as GTO in Taiwan, The X-Dormitory, Holding Love and Angel 'N' Devil, etc.

2015: Love Killah and Dangerous 
In the second half of 2014, Comic International Productions recruited three new members, including Riley (Taiwanese-Canadian), Win (Japanese) and Ian (the youngest member). They were then officially added to the group on January 13, 2015, so that SpeXial consisted of ten members.

SpeXial's first extended play Love Killah was released on February 4, 2015. Since Evan had to finish college in Canada from August 2014 and Brent started fulfilling military service from the end of December, 2014, only eight members participated in the recording. In the first week after the release of Love Killah, SpeXial held their first fan meeting at National Taiwan University Sports Center.
On May 31, SpeXial won "hito Group" and "Most Popular Group" at 2015 hito Music Awards, which were their first two Taiwanese music awards. This event was Evan's comeback showcase, but Brent and Sam were absent at the ceremony as they were fulfilling military service.

In June 2015, SpeXial have been the endorser of a mobile game Junior Three Kingdoms, which was downloaded one million times. In July, the J-pop queen Ayumi Hamasaki and SpeXial collaborated on new single Sayonara feat. SpeXial, they also shot the music video together in Japan. On August 1, SpeXial's first travelogue photobook "SpeXial Life in Thailand" was released, while the shooting process was edited as LINE TV's first reality show SpeXial Life. On August 22, SpeXial were invited to perform at a-nation Summer Concert. It was the first time of them to perform Sayonara feat. SpeXial with Ayumi Hamasaki on stage.

SpeXial's third Mandopop album Dangerous was released on September 11, 2015, while Brent and Sam did not participate in the recording due to military services. Before the release of new album, one of the track Dangerous was selected by 20th Century Fox as the Chinese theme song of the film Maze Runner: The Scorch Trials. At the end of September, SpeXial held their second fan meeting under the theme of athletic meet at National Taiwan University Sports Center.

2016: First major concert and Boyz On Fire 
On January 5, 2016, KKBOX announced that Ding Dang and SpeXial were invited as guest performers of the 11th KKBOX Music Awards Presentation, which was SpeXial's first time performing at this ceremony. On January 9, SpeXial were firstly invited to participate in the recording of TTV's annual Lunar New Year music show - 2016 Super Star: A Red & White Lunar New Year Special. They participated as white team artists and performed two dance songs, Break It Down 11.11 and Dangerous. The music show was then broadcast on February 7. On January 24, SpeXial performed three dance songs at KKBOX Music Awards Presentation, including Love Guardian, Dangerous and Silly Girl. This performance was also Brent's comeback showcase after the end of military service. Although Brent had participated in the 2016 Super Star, the KKBOX Music Awards was broadcast earlier, so this was his official comeback showcase. During these two performance, Sam and Ian were absent at the ceremony as they were fulfilling military service and shooting TV drama respectively.

On May 21–22, SpeXial held their first major concert "SpeXial the 1st concert - SpeXial Land 2016" at Xinzhuang Gymnasium in New Taipei City, while Pets Tseng made guest appearance at their concert. The concert consisted of four themes, which included "Welcome to SpeXial Land", "SpeXial Lover", "Theme Park Challenge" and "Ultimate Theme Park". In addition, SpeXial returned as ten-member group with Sam's comeback showcase one week after the end of military service.

On June 5, SpeXial won "Hito Group" and "Most Popular Group" again at 2016 Hito Music Awards. However, Riley and Ian were absent at the ceremony as they were shooting TV dramas. On July 14, Comic International Productions announced the addition of two new Chinese members Dylan and Zhiwei. They were then debuted at the press conference of fourth Mandopop album Boyz On Fire on July 19, the album was released on August 12. Apart from starring in dramas KO ONE: RE-MEMBER and High 5 Basketball, SpeXial took part in film and micro films and hosted a number of variety shows. Meanwhile, SpeXial entered the Chinese market by taking part in web series and web films such as Ultimate Ranger, Men with Sword and Realm of the Immortals, etc.

On October 25, Wes injured his right leg with a comminuted fracture while shooting High 5 Basketball. He then announced that he will take a three-month break from his activities to rest on November 7. It is expected that Wes will come back in February 2017. On November 4, Simon dropped out of Master's Program at National Taiwan University of Arts to prepare for military service. He continued to work until the last public event, the press conference of High 5 Basketball, held on December 11.

2017: Buddy Buddy 
On January 25, Simon announced on his personal Facebook fan page that he has filed for contract termination from Comic International Productions due to "unclear accounts", and he intended to leave SpeXial. He is still close and often hangs out with the rest of the members.

On February 9, SpeXial's second travelogue photobook "SpeXial Okinawa Photobook" was released, while the shooting process was edited as LINE TV's reality show SpeXial Life 2. During the shooting of Photobook, SpeXial directed their own music video for "Really Really" from the album Boyz On Fire. These three projects were the last projects of SpeXial consisted of twelve members.

On March 20, Zhiwei officially announced that he was leaving the group. On August 25, Riley officially announced that he was leaving the group after his contract was terminated due to different career goals (he is still close and often hangs out with the other members). As a result, SpeXial will continue as a nine-member group, including Wes, Wayne, Brent, Sam, Evan, Teddy, Win, Ian and Dylan.

On December 17, the press conference for SpeXial's fifth album 'Buddy Buddy' was held in Beijing. The album was released on December 22.

2018: Buddy Buddy 
On January 5, SpeXial held a press conference for their fifth album 'Buddy Buddy' in Taiwan. However, Dylan was absent due to filming. On January 13, SpeXial was once again invited to participate in the '2018 Super Star' Awards for New Year's Eve, performing six songs, Buddy Buddy, Love Killah, Dangerous, Break it Down, Bad Bad Boy and Super Style, as singers from the white team. The program was broadcast February 15. Wes was originally unable to go on stage due to his leg injury, but in order to be with his fans and group members on New Year's Eve, he disregarded his injury and danced along to Super Style with them. Dylan was absent due to filming.

On March 23, Wayne announced on his birthday that he was going to enlist in the army in August, and it was expected that his first solo concert would be held before May 27. On May 15, Wes updated his Facebook contact information to the contact of the new company, and officially leave SpeXial now that his contract with Comic International Productions has ended, however the real reason was his leg injury never completely healed and it was difficult for him to dance. SpeXial will continue their activities in their group of eight, consisting of Wayne, Brent, Sam, Evan, Teddy, Win, Ian and Dylan.On December 17, a press conference was held in Beijing targeting the group's fifth album, Buddy Buddy, which was released on December 22.

2018: Wes' departure 
On January 5, 2018, a new press conference was organized for Buddy Buddy in Taiwan. However, Dylan was absent due to filming of other projects. On January 13, the group was again invited to participate in the 2018 Super Star 'Awards for New Years Eve, performing six songs: Buddy Buddy, Love Killah, Dangerous, Break It Down, Bad Bad Boy, and Super Style. The show aired on February 15.

On March 23, Wayne announced on his birthday that he was going to enlist in the army for his military service and that he expected his first solo concert to take place before May 27. On May 15, the group's leader, Wes, announced that he planned to leave SpeXial now that his contract with Comic International Productions had ended, in large part because his leg injury never fully healed and was It made it difficult for him to dance. His departure from the group took place that same day, 28 leaving the group with eight members; Wayne, Brent, Sam, Evan, Teddy, Win, Ian, and Dylan. Wayne enlisted in the military on September 3, 2018, and his military service ended on August 12, 2019.

2019: Wayne and Teddy's departure 
On September 19, 2019, Wayne announced that he would be leaving SpeXial. Teddy announced his departure from SpeXial on October 15, 2019, the same day as his twenty-sixth birthday.

2020: Brent and Sam's departure 
On February 7, member Brent announced on the live streaming network's platform that he was officially retiring from SpeXial.

On May 7, 2020, member Sam announced on his Facebook fan page that he would be joining TVBS, confirming his official retirement from SpeXial.

Members

Members' information

Timeline 

 First period members (Wes, Wayne, Brent, Sam) formed SpeXial on December 7, 2012.
 Second period members (Simon, Evan, Teddy) joined SpeXial on June 5, 2014.
 Evan finished college in Canada from August 3, 2014, and came back on May 31, 2015.
 Brent fulfilled military service from December 23, 2014 to December 10, 2015.
 Third period members (Win, Riley, Ian) joined SpeXial on January 14, 2015.
 Sam fulfilled military service from May 15, 2015 to May 14, 2016.
 Fourth period members (Dylan, Zhiwei) joined SpeXial on July 19, 2016.
 Wes injured his right leg while shooting High 5 Basketball on October 25, 2015. He had to take a three month break until February 2017 (expected).
 Simon stopped working from December 12, 2016 to prepare for military service. He then announced that he has filed for contract termination on January 25, 2017, and officially left the group on February 2, 2017.
 Zhiwei changed his Facebook and Weibo information on March 12, 2017 and officially left the group on March 23, 2017.
 Riley announced that he will terminate contract with the company and officially leaving the group on August 25, 2017.

Discography

Studio albums

Extended play

Original soundtrack

Singles 
 Sayonara feat. SpeXial (2015) — SpeXial (collaborated with Ayumi Hamasaki, appeared on her sixth extended play sixxxxxx)
 劍心飛揚 (2016) — Evan and Dylan
 月光訣 (2016) — Dylan
 終有一天 (2016) — Zhiwei (collaborated with Li Shaminzi, Yu Shuxin, Cheng Yi, Tian Yitong and Liu Runnan)
 I'm Your Super Wang / 我是你的super王 (2017) — Ian
 Hero / 英雄 (2017) — Dylan and Zhiwei (collaborated with Cha Jie, Ryuuji Zhu, Lu Yunfeng and Peng Yuchang
 Fight For You (2017) — Riley
 膽小鬼 (2017) — Wayne
 畫師 (2017) — Dylan
 超完美情人 (2017) — Brent
 冒险家 (2017) — Dylan
 戰火荒煙 (2017) — Dylan
 破泪 (2017) — Wayne and Dylan
 無名將 (2017) — Evan and Ian

Concert

Filmography

Television series

Web series

Feature film

Short film

TV film

Web film

Reality show

Variety show

Music videos

Publications

Photobook

Television series publications

Awards and nominations

References

External links 

 SpeXial official Facebook page
 SpeXial official Weibo
 SpeXial YouTube channel
 SpeXial on Warner Music Taiwan
 Comic International Productions official Facebook page
 Warner Music Taiwan official Facebook page
 Warner Music Taiwan Store

Taiwanese boy bands
Mandopop musical groups
Musical groups established in 2012
2012 establishments in Taiwan